KSAW may refer to:

 KSAW-LD, a low-power television station (channel 28, virtual 6) licensed to serve Twin Falls, Idaho, United States
 Sawyer International Airport (ICAO code KSAW)